Eric George Adolph Erickson  (March 13, 1892 – May 19, 1965), sometimes known by the nickname "Swat, was a Swedish-born baseball pitcher.  He played professional baseball for 12 years from 1914 to 1925, including seven years in Major League Baseball with the New York Giants (1914), Detroit Tigers (1916, 1918–1919), and Washington Senators (1919–1922). He compiled a career win–loss record of 34–57 with a 3.85 earned run average (ERA). He is the only Swedish-born player in MLB history to appear in more than 1 or 2 games.

Early years
Erickson was born in Vårgårda, Sweden, in 1892.

Professional baseball
Erickson was the second player born in Sweden to play in the major leagues. Erickson was a right-handed pitcher who debuted with the Giants in 1914.  Erickson pitched in only one game for the Giants, going five innings and giving up seven runs, though none were earned.  In 1916, the Detroit Tigers gave Erickson a second chance, and he played parts of three seasons in Detroit, never having a winning season.  He was traded to the Senators in 1919 and had his best seasons there.  In 1919, as a teammate of Walter Johnson, Erickson led the American League in strikeouts per nine innings with 5.52, though he also was among the league leaders in hit batsmen and wild pitches.  In 1921, Erickson was among the league leaders in ERA (3.62), strikeouts per nine innings (3.57), shutouts (3) and hit batsmen (11).

Erickson also pitched for several minor league teams.  He led the San Francisco Seals to a Pacific Coast League pennant in 1917 and won the 1917 PCL pitching Triple Crown, winning 31 games with a 1.93 earned run average and 307 strikeouts in 444 innings.

Later years
After his days in professional baseball, he worked in the shipping department of a metal company and also ran a farm.  He died in 1965 at the age of 73 in Jamestown, New York.

References

1892 births
1965 deaths
Detroit Tigers players
Major League Baseball pitchers
New York Giants (NL) players
Washington Senators (1901–1960) players
Major League Baseball players from Sweden
Dallas Giants players
Rochester Hustlers players
San Francisco Seals (baseball) players
Toronto Maple Leafs (International League) players
Swedish emigrants to the United States